Timino is a rural locality (a village) in Andreyevskoye Rural Settlement, Vashkinsky District, Vologda Oblast, Russia. The population was 15 as of 2002.

Geography 
The distance to Lipin Bor is 19 km, to Andreyevskaya is 4 km. Alyoshkovo is the nearest rural locality.

References 

Rural localities in Vashkinsky District